Mile High is the twelfth studio album by American rap-rock group Kottonmouth Kings. It was released on August 14, 2012 on the band's own Suburban Noize Records.  The album has sold 28,000 copies in the United States as of August 2015.

Track listing

Credits 
 D-Loc: vocals
 Johnny Richter: vocals
 Daddy X: vocals
 The Dirtball: vocals
 DJ Bobby B: producer, turntables, vocals
 Lou Dog: drums
 The Taxman

Charts

References 

2012 albums
Kottonmouth Kings albums
Suburban Noize Records albums